The LAPAN LSU-02 (LAPAN Surveillance UAV-02) is an unmanned aerial vehicle (UAV) developed by the Lembaga Penelitian dan Penerbangan Nasional (LAPAN) of Indonesia. It was developed in 2012 for both civilian and military purposes. The Indonesian military classifies it as a tactical UAV because of its ability to fly over long ranges (300 km, theoretically 450 km) for its size. It broke an Indonesian record for longest ranged UAV built locally.

Operational history
The LSU-02 was used in the 2013 Indonesian Army joint exercise in the Java Sea, launched from the helicopter deck of KRI Diponegoro 365. The mission was to provide target surveillance for an Exocet MM40 missile. The aircraft can loiter autonomously near its target, with average speed of 70 km/h. In this exercise, the UAV flew for 2 hours and 45 minutes, covering about 200 km.

In 2016, an LSU-02 was used to photograph 300 km of the coastline south of Java Island, as part of a data collection project to update mapping of the territorial coastline of Indonesia. The LSU-02 photographed Java's southern coastline, starting from Parangtritis, Yogyakarta, to Popoh Beach, Trenggalek, East Java. Photographing continued on Pacitan beach, East Java on its 100 km coastline.

Specifications (LSU-02)

See also 

 Lapan LSU-03

References

External links 

 Official website archive on archive.org

Unmanned aerial vehicles of Indonesia
Single-engined pusher aircraft